Kanniyakumari (referring to Devi Kanya Kumari), also known as Cape Comorin, is a city in Kanniyakumari district in the state of Tamil Nadu, India. It is the southern tip of the Indian subcontinent and the southernmost city in mainland India, and thus referred to as "The Land's End".

Kanniyakumari is a popular tourist destination and pilgrimage centre in India. Notable tourist spots include its unique sunrise and sunset points, the  Thiruvalluvar Statue, and Vivekananda Rock Memorial off the coast. Lying at the tip of peninsular India, the town is bordered on the west, south, and east by the Laccadive Sea. It has a coastline of  stretched along these three sides.

On the shores of the city is a temple dedicated to Goddess Kanniyakumari (the virgin Goddess), after which the town is named. Kanniyakumari has been a city since the Sangam period and was referred to in old Malayalam literature and in the accounts of Ptolemy and Marco Polo.

History

Etymology
The place derives its name from the goddess Kanya Kumari, considered to be the sister of Krishna. The goddess is believed to remove the rigidity from the mind, and women pray for marriage at her temple. In 1656, the Dutch East India Company conquered Portuguese Ceylon from the Portuguese East Indies, and the name eventually corrupted to "Comorin" and was called "Cape Comorin" during British rule in India. In 2016, the city and its district were renamed to "Kanniyakumari" by the Government of India and the Government of Madras.

Legend 
According to a Hindu legend, Kanya Devi, an avatar of Parvati, was to marry Shiva, who failed to show up on his wedding day. Rice and other grains meant for the wedding feast remained uncooked and unused. The uncooked grains turned into stones as time went by. Some believe that the small stones on the shore today, which look like rice, are indeed grains from the wedding that was never solemnised. Kanya Devi is now considered a virgin goddess who blesses pilgrims and tourists who flock to the town. Her temple in Kanniyakumari is a Shakti Peetha: a holy shrine in the Shaktism tradition of Hinduism.

According to another Hindu legend, Hanuman dropped a piece of earth near Kanniyakumari as he was carrying a mountain with his life-saving herb, Mrita Sanjivani, from the Himalayas to Lanka (Sri Lanka) during the Ramayana War. The fallen earth formed an area called Marunthuvazh Malai, literally "hills where medicine lives". This legend explains the abundance of unique native medicinal plants in the area. The sage Agasthya, who was an expert in medicinal herbs, is believed to have lived around this site in ancient days. There is an ashram on the middle of the hillside; tourists trek up to visit the ashram and to glimpse the sea near Kanniyakumari town, a few kilometres away.

Demographics
As per the 2011 Census, Kanniyakumari town consisted of 61.16% Christians, 32.97% Hindus, and 5.47% Muslims. It had a population of 19,739, comprising 9,884 males and 9,855 females, making the sex ratio (number of females per thousand males) of the town 997. A total of 2,403 people were under six years of age and the child sex ratio (number of females per thousand males under six years of age) stood at 1,024. The town had an average literacy of 88.62%, higher than the national average of 59.5%. There were a total of 4,236 households in the town.

As of 2001, Kanniyakumari had a total of 5,929 main workers: 11 cultivators, 78 agricultural labourers, 66 in household industries, and 5,774 other workers. There were a total of 119 marginal workers: 4 marginal cultivators, 3 marginal agricultural labourers, 11 marginal workers in household industries, and 101 other marginal workers.

Geography

The peninsular tip of Kanniyakumari is bordered on three sides by the Laccadive Sea. It is located at the confluence of the Western Coastal Plains and Eastern Coastal Plains. The nearest city is Thiruvananthapuram, Kerala ( away), and the nearest town is Nagercoil, the administrative headquarters of Kanniyakumari district ( away).

Kanniyakumari is at the southern tip and is the southernmost point of the contiguous Indian Subcontinent. As such, it is part of the common Hindustani phrase used to describe the length of India: "Kashmir se Kanniyakumari"; before the partition, the phrase in undivided India was "Khyber se Kanniyakumari". However, the southernmost point of Republic of India is at Indira Point on Great Nicobar Island, at 6°45’10″N and 93°49’36″E.

Climate

Notable landmarks

Thiruvalluvar Statue

The Thiruvalluvar Statue is a 7,000-ton stone statue of poet and philosopher Valluvar. The statue standing on the rock represents wealth and pleasures, signifying that wealth and love be earned and enjoyed on the foundation of solid virtue.

The statue is reminiscent of a dancing pose of Nataraja. It was sculpted by the Indian sculptor V. Ganapati Sthapati, who also created the Iraivan Temple, and its opening ceremony was on 1 January 2000. The monument was hit by the Indian Ocean tsunami on 26 December 2004, but stood unaffected. The statue is designed to survive earthquakes of high magnitude. During maintenance work, as well as during rough sea, entry is restricted for tourists.

Vivekananda Rock Memorial

The Vivekananda Rock Memorial is a popular tourist monument in Vavathurai, Kanniyakumari, India. It was built in 1970 in honour of Swami Vivekananda who is said to have attained enlightenment on the rock. According to local legends, it was on this rock that Goddess Kumari performed austerity. A meditation hall (Dhyana Mandapam) is also attached to the memorial for visitors to meditate. The design of the mandapa incorporates different styles of temple architecture from all over India. It houses a statue of Vivekananda. The memorial consists of two main structures: the Vivekananda Mandapam and the Shripada Mandapam.

Bhagavathy Amman Temple

Bhagavathy Amman Temple is a 3,000-year-old temple dedicated to Goddess Kumari Amman located at Kanniyakumari on the shore of the Laccadive Sea. Kumari Amman is one of the forms of Devi, popularly known as "Kumari Bhagavathy Amman". The temple is the first Durga temple created by Lord Parasurama and one of the 108 Shakthi Peethas. It is mentioned in the Ramayana, Mahabharata, and Purananuru.

Gandhi Memorial Mandapam

The Gandhi Memorial Mandapam has been built on the spot where the urn containing the Mahatma's ashes was kept for public viewing before immersion. Resembling central Indian Hindu temples in form, the memorial was designed such that on Gandhi's birthday, 2 October, the first rays of the sun fall on the exact place where his ashes were kept.

Kamarajar Mani Mantapa Monument
Kamarajar Mani Mantapa Monument was raised and dedicated to K. Kamarajar, a freedom fighter, former Chief Minister of Tamil Nadu, and President of Indian National Congress. He is also popularly known as "Black Gandhi" among the masses. Like the Gandhi Memorial Mandapam, this monument is where Kamarajar's ashes were kept for the public to pay homage before immersion into the sea.

Tsunami Memorial Park

Near Kanniyakumari's southern shore stands a monument to the memory of those who died in the 2004 Indian Ocean earthquake and tsunami, an underwater megathrust earthquake that claimed around 280,000 lives in many countries, including India, Sri Lanka, Somalia, Thailand, Maldives, and Indonesia.

Tourism

The state-owned Poompuhar Shipping Corporation runs ferry services between the town and the Vivekananda Rock Memorial and Thiruvalluvar Statue, both situated on rocky islets off the coast. The operation of the ferry service began in 1984. Two ferries were used until June 2013, after which a third ferry was added to the service on the occasion of 150th birth anniversary of Swamy Vivekananda.

The Kanniyakumari railway station and nearby Nagercoil railway station offer direct connection by rail to almost all metropolitan cities in India.

See also
 Devi Kanya Kumari

References

External links

 Kanniyakumari District Government Portal
 

 
Cities and towns in Kanyakumari district
Coromandel Coast
Tourism in Tamil Nadu